Northman (fl. 994) was a Northumbrian ealdorman.

Northman may also refer to:

 Northman, son of Leofwine (died 1017), Mercian thegn
 Northman, a viking
 Edith Northman, American architect
 Eric Northman, a character in The Southern Vampire Mysteries
 Pam Northman, better known as Pamela Swynford De Beaufort, a character in The Southern Vampire Mysteries
 The Northman, a 2022 American epic historical action drama film by Robert Eggers

See also

 
 Norsemen
 Norseman (disambiguation)
 Northmen (disambiguation)